Danilo Mitrović (born 23 March 2001) is a Serbian football centre-back who plays for BW Linz.

References

External links
 
 
 

2001 births
Living people
Association football defenders
Serbian footballers
2. Liga (Austria) players
FC Blau-Weiß Linz players
Serbian expatriate footballers
Expatriate footballers in Austria
Serbian expatriate sportspeople in Austria
Serbia under-21 international footballers